The rufous-lored tyrannulet (Phylloscartes flaviventris) is a species of bird in the family Tyrannidae. It is found in the Venezuelan Coastal Range. Its natural habitat is subtropical or tropical moist montane forests.

References

Further reading
 
 

rufous-lored tyrannulet
Birds of the Venezuelan Coastal Range
rufous-lored tyrannulet
Taxonomy articles created by Polbot